This is a list of films originally made by Troma Entertainment

For a complete list of films distributed by Troma, click on List of Troma Team Video titles

1970s

1979 
Squeeze Play!

1980s

1980 
Mother's Day
Border Cop

1981 
Waitress!
Rana: The Legend of Shadow Lake

1982 
Ferocious Female Freedom Fighters
Stuck on You!

1983 
The First Turn-On!

1984 
Dreams Come True
The Toxic Avenger
Combat Shock
Wildrose

1985 
Igor and the Lunatics
When Nature Calls

1986 
Hollywood Zap!
Class of Nuke 'Em High

1987 
Chillers
Student Confidential
Lust for Freedom
Surf Nazis Must Die
Deadly Daphne's Revenge

1988 
Troma's War
Rabid Grannies
Jakarta

1989 
Blades
Dialing for Dingbats
Bloodbath in Psycho Town
Beware: Children at Play! 
The Toxic Avenger Part II
Fortress of Amerikkka
Dead Dudes in the House
The Toxic Avenger Part III: The Last Temptation of Toxie
Chopper Chicks in Zombietown

1990s

1990 
A Nymphoid Barbarian in Dinosaur Hell
Sgt. Kabukiman N.Y.P.D.

1991 
Class of Nuke 'Em High 2: Subhumanoid Meltdown
They Call Me Macho Woman!
Tomcat Angels
Vegas in Space

1992 
Body Parts

1993 
 The Troma System

1994 
House of the Rising
Class of Nuke 'Em High 3: The Good, the Bad and the Subhumanoid

1995 
Frostbiter: Wrath of the Wendigo

1996 

Blondes Have More Guns

Tromeo and Juliet

1997 
Hamster PSA (Short film)
Pterodactyl Woman from Beverly Hills
Bugged

1998 
Fag Hag 
Decampitated
Viewer Discretion Advised

1999 
Touch Me in the Morning
Backroad Diner
So Shall You Reap
Terror Firmer

2000s

2000 
Dumpster Baby
The Rowdy Girls
Citizen Toxie: The Toxic Avenger IV

2001 
The Making of 'Terror Firmer'''

 2002 Apocalypse Soon: The Making of 'Citizen Toxie'The Best of Tromadance Film Festival, Volume 1All the Love You Cannes!Le Diamant Des Damnes (2002) (Short film)

 2003 Parts of the FamilyDoggie Tails, Vol. 1: Lucky's First Sleep-Over 2004 Kung-Fu Kitties (Short film)Monkey Brains (Short film)Dummy Drunk (Short film)Anomalous Humanite (Short film)Period PieceTales from the Crapper 2005 976-Lars (Short film)Make Your Own Damn Movie!Devoured: The Legend of Alfred Packer 2006 Debbie Rochon Confidential: My Years in Tromaville Exposed!Poultrygeist: Night of the Chicken DeadYeti: A Love Story 2007 Dancing Into the FutureUchuujin from Outer Space 2008 The Amnesia Party (Short film)Poultry in Motion: Truth Is Stranger Than Chicken 2009 My Best Maniac (Short film)Direct Your Own Damn Movie!The Sweet Sound of Dubbing: Dubbing ‘The Sweet Sound of Death’ 2010s 

 2010 Troma Digital Studios: A Lesson in BrownRay (Short film)The Killer BraMother's DayKlown Kamp Massacre 2011 PUTA: People for the Upstanding Treatment of AnimalsFather's DayThe Taint 2012 Death on the D-List 2013 Return to Nuke 'Em High Volume 1 2014 Return to Nuke 'Em High's Buffalo Dreams (Short film)A Halloween Carol (Short film)

 2015 Make Your Own Damn Movie: The Master ClassThe Return of Dolphin Man (Short film)Dolphinman vs Turkeyman (Short film)A Very Troma Christmas (Short film)Kabukiman's Non-denominational Holiday Extravaganza (Short film)Kabukiman: Behind the Chopsticks (Short film)

 2016 Kabukiman vs Dracula (Short film)Kabukiman's Cocktail Corner: Live at the Trocadero Theatre! (Short film)KABUKI-CON: Kabukiman's Cocktail Corner Special (Short film)Dolphinman Battles the Sex Lobsters (Short film)The 12 Slays of ChristmasPresident Toxie's Oval Office Address (Short film)Essex Spacebin 2017 Return to Return to Nuke 'Em High AKA Volume 2Troma Entertainment's Pre-Pre-Show Hack Job (Short film)Heart of Fartness: Troma's First VR Experience Starring the Toxic Avenger (Short film)Sgt. Ka-Spooky-Man's Cray-Cray VR Halloween Extravaganza (Short film)

 2018 Troma Now Presents: A Stankmouth New Year's Eve Special (Short film)Kabukiman's Cocktail Corner: Loaded in Las Vegas (Short film)Troma Now Presents: Tromanda's Tromatic Transformation (Short film)Troma Now Presents: March Tromania Madness (Short film)Festival to Fascism: Cannes 2017 (Short film)Heavy Toxification (Short film)Mutant Blast 2019 Trouble in Nightingale (Short film)Blood Stab (Short film)

 2020s 
TBAThe Toxic Avenger''

See also 
 List of horror films
 List of fantasy films
 Lists of science fiction films

External links 
 Troma's own movie database
 Troma's production filmography on IMDbPro